Edward Butler may refer to:

Politicians
 Edward Butler (Australian politician) (1823–1879), barrister and politician in colonial New South Wales
 Edward Butler (British politician), British Member of Parliament for Oxford University, 1737–1745
 Edward Butler (Louisiana politician), served in the Louisiana Senate
 Edward Butler (Missouri politician) (1834–1911), political boss of St. Louis and Missouri, see Bottoms Gang
 Edward Butler (New Hampshire politician) (born 1949), Democratic member of the New Hampshire House of Representatives

Peers
 Edward Butler, 1st Viscount Galmoye (died 1653), Irish peer
 Edward Butler, 2nd Viscount Galmoye (1627–1667), Irish peer

Military
 Edward Butler (soldier) (1762–1803), United States Army officer
 Sir Edward Gerald Butler (1770–1825), Irish officer in the British Army

Others
 Edward Butler (academic) (1686–1745), English academic administrator at the University of Oxford
 Edward Butler (cricketer, born 1851) (1851–1928), Australian cricketer
 Edward Butler (cricketer, born 1883) (1883–1916), Australian cricketer
 Edward Butler (inventor) (1862–1940), British motorbike inventor
 Edward Butler (Irish judge) (died 1584), Anglo-Irish law officer and judge
 Edward Arthur Butler (1843–1916), English ornithologist
 Edward Burgess Butler (1853–1928), American businessman
 Edward Hubert Butler Sr. (1850–1914), founder of the Buffalo Evening News in 1873
 Edward Hubert Butler Jr. (1883–1956), American publisher and editor of Buffalo Evening News
 Edward Mann Butler (1784–1855), educator in the US state of Kentucky
 Edward Montagu Butler (1866–1948), English cricketer
 Edward Scannell Butler, Director of the Information Council of the Americas, see Carlos Bringuier
 Edward Butler, member of the Balcombe Street gang

See also
 Eddie Butler (disambiguation)
 Ed Butler